Shepherd Kofi Agbeko (born 11 October 1985) is a Ghanaian sprinter who specializes in the 200 metres.

He finished sixth at the 2011 All-Africa Games, and also reached the semi-final at the 2008 African Championships, the 2012 African Championships and the 2015 African Games

He also won a bronze medal in the 4 × 100 metres relay at the 2015 African Games.

His personal best times are 10.70 seconds in the 100 metres, achieved in May 2012 in Ouagadougou; and 20.92 seconds in the 200 metres, achieved in August 2011 in Kumasi.

References

1985 births
Living people
Ghanaian male sprinters
African Games bronze medalists for Ghana
African Games medalists in athletics (track and field)
Athletes (track and field) at the 2011 All-Africa Games
Athletes (track and field) at the 2015 African Games